The Sarawat Mountains, also known as the Sarat, is a part of the Hijaz Mountains in the western part of the Arabian Peninsula. In a broad sense, it runs parallel to the eastern coast of the Red Sea, and thus encompasses the mountains of Fifa', 'Asir and Taif (which can be seen as including the Midian Mountains). In a narrow sense, the Sarawat start in Taif city in Saudi Arabia, and extend to the Gulf of Aden in the south, running along the entire western coast of Yemen, in what used to be North Yemen, and extend eastwards into part of what used to be South Yemen, thus running parallel to the Gulf of Aden.

Geology

These mountains are mainly rocky though some contain vegetation. Many of the peaks are fairly young and jagged, but some are smoother from weathering. Nearing the Yemeni border, the Sarawat begin to spread into individual peaks, and the Hejaz turns from a cliff to a gradual ascent up to the Yemeni Plateau. In Yemen, the Sarawat are divided into the western and central highlands, where the western highlands receive plenty of precipitation, more than anywhere else in the peninsula, and the central highlands have the highest mountains in the peninsula. At , Jabal An-Nabi Shu'ayb is also the highest peak in Arabia.

Geologically, the Sarawat is part of the Arabian Shield, and are made up mostly of volcanic rock. The western slopes end abruptly near the Red Sea coast, while the eastern side of the mountain range slopes downward more gently and is intersected by wadis that support agriculture, especially in the southern reaches of the Sarawat, where the mountains face the monsoons. Among the cities located within the Sarawat is the Yemeni capital, San'a, located near some of the Sarawat's highest peaks.

Wildlife

The presence of the Arabian leopard was reported here. Hamadryas baboons are present in both Yemen and Saudi Arabia.

Gallery

See also

 Hajhir Mountains
 South Arabia
 Southwestern Arabian foothills savanna
 Tihamah

References

Mountain ranges of Saudi Arabia
Mountain ranges of mainland Yemen
Southwestern Arabian foothills savanna